Star News Asia was the flagship daily evening television news programmes from Hong Kong, broadcast on STAR World (formerly known as STAR Plus) and STAR Chinese Channel

Timeslots

Chinese
21 October 1991 – 30 March 1996:
19:00-20:00 HKT.

English
15 December 1991 – 30 March 1996:
20:00-21:00 HKT.
31 March 1996 – 28 February 2009:
19:00-20:00 HKT.

1991 Hong Kong television series debuts
2009 Hong Kong television series endings
Hong Kong television news shows